North Oak Park is the home stadium for the Division I (NCAA) Southeastern Louisiana Lady Lions softball team. The stadium is located on the campus of Southeastern Louisiana University in Hammond, Louisiana.  Amenities include bleacher seating for 500 fans; field lighting; a brick wall along the foul lines; an electronic scoreboard; dugouts; outdoor batting cages; concessions; restrooms; and locker rooms.

The stadium was the home of 2005 and 2014 Southland Conference softball tournament.  The 2020 Southland Conference softball tournament was also scheduled to be held at the stadium prior to the COVID-19 pandemic cancelled the tournament.

References

External links
 Southeastern Louisiana Lady Lions Softball Official Website

Southeastern Louisiana Lady Lions softball
College softball venues in the United States
Softball venues in Louisiana
Sports venues in Hammond, Louisiana